Pressure Cooker is a cooking video game for the Atari 2600 written by Garry Kitchen and released by Activision in 1983. The player is a short-order cook at a hamburger stand who must assemble and package hamburgers to order without letting ingredients or hamburgers fall to the floor. Kitchen also wrote the Atari 2600 game Keystone Kapers for Activision.

Gameplay

Hamburgers go through an oven and are placed on a conveyor belt headed in the player's general direction. In order to satisfy customers' orders (seen on a chart at the bottom of the screen), the player must catch the flying toppings for a particular order and place them on the burger. Once a burger is assembled, the player must catch the top bun, place it on the burger, and then drop the completed burger into the proper colored slot. Once all the slots are filled, the level ends, and the player receives bonus points for remaining performance points (see below) and for every burger successfully completed.

Performance points
The player begins the game with 50 performance points. Errors that result in the loss of performance points are:
 Being hit in the back or side with a flying topping (-1 point)
 Allowing a flying topping to hit the wall (-1 point)
 Placing the same topping on the same burger twice (-1 point)
 Dropping the burger into the wrong slot or missing a slot altogether (-5 points)
 Allowing a burger to fall off the conveyor belt (-10 points)

After losing all performance points, the game is over.

References

External links
Pressure Cooker at Atari Mania
Pressure Cooker at AtariAge

1983 video games
Activision games
Atari 2600 games
Atari 2600-only games
Cooking video games
Video games designed by Garry Kitchen
Video games developed in the United States